Caulospongia elegans is a species of sea sponge belonging to the family Suberitidae. It is found in Australia.

References 

Suberitidae
Sponges described in 1888
Sponges of Australia